Komkov (from комок meaning small lump) is a Russian masculine surname, its feminine counterpart is Komkova. It may refer to
Mikhail Komkov (born 1984), Russian football player
Saba Komkova, Soviet sprint canoer
Vadim Komkov (1919–2008), Russian-American mathematician

See also
Komov

Russian-language surnames